Can You Hear Me? is an alleged telephone scam that started occurring in the United States and Canada in 2017. It is alternatively known as the Say "Yes" Scam. Reports of this scam and warnings to the public have continued into 2020 in the US. There have also several reports of the same kind of incidents happening in Europe. Questions have been raised as to whether such a scam actually occurred, or if it occurred in the form generally described.

Background
According to news reports on the alleged scam, victims of the purported fraud receive telephone calls from an unknown person who asks "can you hear me"? The victim's response of "yes" is recorded and subsequently used to make unauthorized purchases in the victim's name. More specifically, some experts suggest scammers may be looking to record the person saying the word "Yes" to then claim they agreed to authorize changes on a phone, utility, or credit card bill. Between January and February 2017, the existence of the scam was reported by multiple media outlets including CBS News and NPR affiliate WNYC-FM. In January 2017, Seattle NBC affiliate KING-TV contacted police agencies in western Washington and reported no authorities had heard of the scam; in a follow-up story the next month the station reported that many police in the area had since received concerned inquiries about "the scam that was sweeping the country".

In early February 2017 the Delta, British Columbia newspaper The Delta Optimist reported that "the 'Can you hear me?' scam had now crossed the border into Canada".

By the end of February 2017, the scam was reported in the United Kingdom by CPR Call Blocker, a call blocking company warning of it in The Independent.

On March 27, 2017, the FCC issued an official warning about the telephone scam. They defined it as, "Scammers open by asking a yes-or-no question, such as: "Can you hear me?" or "Is this X?" Their goal is to record you saying "yes" in response. They then may use that recording to authorize charges over the phone."

On February 12, 2020, the Better Business Bureau issued a warning that there had been recent reports of the “Can you hear me?” scam in Vermont.

Veracity
Investigating reports of the possible scam, Snopes noted that all purported targets of the scam only reported having been victimized after hearing about the scam in news reports. Snopes went on to note that it had contacted the Better Business Bureau, the Federal Trade Commission, and the Consumer Federation of America, none of whom could provide evidence of an individual actually having been financially defrauded after receiving one of the telephone calls. Snopes also analyzed a number of news reports in which media interviewed self-identified victims of the scam; in none of the stories it looked at did a victim report having been financially defrauded after receiving one of the phone calls. Snopes ultimately classified the claims as "unproven".

Tom Lyons, a columnist at the Sarasota Herald-Tribune, and an official at the caller ID company Hiya conjectured that the purported calls were an automated dialer employed by a telemarketing firm to confirm the authenticity of the telephone numbers on its dialing lists, and not an attempt at financial fraud.

References

Confidence tricks
Urban legends
Telephone crimes